This is a partial list of Jupiter's  trojans (60° ahead of Jupiter) with numbers 200001–300000 .

200001–300000 

This list contains 777 objects sorted in numerical order.

top

References 
 

 Greek_2
Jupiter Trojans (Trojan Camp)
Lists of Jupiter trojans